The Young Pioneers of China, often shortened to the Young Pioneers, is a mass youth organization for children aged six to fourteen in the People's Republic of China. The Young Pioneers of China is run by the Communist Youth League, an organization of older youth that comes under the Chinese Communist Party (CCP). The Young Pioneers of China is similar to Pioneer Movements that exist or existed in many Communist countries around the world.

History

The Youth and Children of China Movement was created on October 13, 1949, by the CCP, and given its present name in June 1953. Between its own founding in 1921 and the founding of the People's Republic in 1949, the CCP ran various other youth movements in communist-held areas.

During the Cultural Revolution (1966–1978), the Young Pioneers Movement was temporarily dismantled. It was replaced by the Little Red Guards, who were the younger counterparts of the Red Guards, the implementers of the Cultural Revolution. The Young Pioneers Movement was restarted in October 1978.

The transfer of sovereignty of Hong Kong and Macau in 1997 and 1999 respectively has not seen the expansion of CCP organizations (except two small working committees in Liaison Office of HK & Macau) to those areas, including the Young Pioneers.

Membership

Young Pioneers consist of children between the ages of six and fourteen; upon reaching the age of fourteen, members automatically exit the Young Pioneers and may go on to join the Communist Youth League.

Most elementary school students are Young Pioneers by the time they graduate from grade school. Most of the schools require students of the right age to become Young Pioneers. There were an estimated 130 million Young Pioneers in China, as of 2002.

Organization

According to the Young Pioneers constitution, each school or village organizes a Pioneer Battalion, which is divided into Pioneer Companies each corresponding to a class, which is then further divided into Pioneer Squads/Teams each with a handful of members. Each team has a leader and an assistant leader, ; each of the school Companies is led by a committee of between three and seven members; and a Young Pioneers Committee of between seven and fifteen members serve as the battalion leadership staff. Adult leaders are chosen from either the Communist Youth League or from local teaching staff (called counselor).

The current chairperson of the NPSC-YPC is Fu Zhenbang

Constitution

The Constitution was officially passed on June 1, 1954, on international Children's Day. It has since been amended many times. The full text is available on Wikisource.

Symbols

Flag

According to the Young Pioneers Constitution, the flag is red, symbolizing the victory of the Revolution; the five-pointed star in the middle symbolizes the leadership of the CCP, while the torch symbolizes brightness down the path of communism.

The Pioneer Battalion flag is 90 x 120 cm, while the flag of each Company is 60 x 80 cm, with an isosceles triangle (60 x 20 cm) removed from the right side. The removed triangle corresponds to the red scarf worn by Young Pioneers.

Emblem

The emblem consists of the star, the torch, and a banner reading "The Young Pioneers of China".

Scarf
The red scarf is the only uniform item. Young Pioneers are often referred to simply as "Red Scarves"; the investiture ceremony often consists of new members having their scarves tied for them by existing members. Children wearing red scarves are a ubiquitous sight in China.

The red scarf is generally worn around the neck and tied, with no woggle. Some local groups also come up with other uniform items.

The Young Pioneers Constitution explains that the scarf corresponds to the missing triangle on the Pioneer Company flag. The Constitution also explains that the red of the scarf comes from the blood sacrificed by martyrs of the Revolution, and that all members should therefore wear the scarf with reverence.

Salute, Slogan, Conduct, Promise
The Young Pioneers Salute consists of bending the right arm and raising the right hand directly above the head, the palm flat and facing downwards, and the fingers together. It symbolizes that the interests of the People supersede all.

The Motto (and Summons) is:
 Chinese: 
 (pinyin: !)
 Translation: "To struggle for the cause of Communism, be prepared!"

To which the response is:
 Chinese: 
 (pinyin: !)
 Translation: "Always prepared!"

The stipulated conduct of Young Pioneers, according to the constitution, is:
 Chinese: 

 Translation: Honesty, Courage, Vivacity, Unity

The Young Pioneers pledge is:

 Chinese: 
 (pinyin: . , .)
 Translation: I am a member of the Young Pioneers of China. Under the Flag of the Young Pioneers I swear: I will love the Communist Party of China, the motherland, and the people; I will study hard, strengthen myself [lit. exercise well], and prepare thus: to contribute my strength to the cause of communism.

Song
The Young Pioneers song is We are the heirs of communism. It was originally the theme song of Heroic Little Eighth-Routers, a 1961 film about the 1958 Second Taiwan Strait Crisis and a real-life group of children who stayed on the frontlines of coastal Fujian in order to help the war effort against Kuomintang forces.

Full dress uniform
Similar to other members of the Pioneer movement worldwide, the full dress uniform is white or blue shirt or polo with undershirt (or skirts for girls) and pants with the red scarf and badges attached to the shirt, with an optional headdress such as a beret. Sometimes even school uniforms are used, the addition being the red scarf, the optional headdress cap and the organizational and rank badges. During sports events YPs wear athletic uniforms.

See also
Vladimir Lenin All-Union Pioneer Organization
Ernst Thälmann Pioneer Organisation
Korean Children's Union
Ho Chi Minh Young Pioneer Organization
José Martí Pioneer Organization

References

External links 

 

Pioneer movement
Chinese Communist Party
Youth organizations established in 1949
Communist Youth League of China
1949 establishments in China